The International AIDS Society (IAS) is the world's largest association of HIV/AIDS professionals, with 11,600 members from over 170 countries , including clinicians, people living with HIV, service providers, policy makers and others. It aims to reduce the global impact of AIDS through collective advocacy. Founded in 1988, IAS headquarters are located in Geneva, and its president since August 2022 is Sharon Lewin. 

The IAS hosts the biennial International AIDS Conference, the IAS Conference on HIV Science, and the HIV Research for Prevention Conference.

History 
The IAS is a non-profit organization founded in 1988, with a mandate to organize the International AIDS Conference. Initially, the IAS headquarters were in Stockholm, and Lars-Olof Kallings was the secretary general from 1988 until 2003.

In 2004, the IAS restructured its organization, expanded the number of professional staff and moved the headquarters to Geneva. The move was intended to strengthen organizational links with other health NGOs and (United Nations) multilateral agencies.

Mission and Office-bearers

The IAS is an advocacy body, using its large membership base and scientific leadership to drive action. It is the world’s largest association of HIV professionals, with 11,600 members from over 170 countries . Among its members are researchers, clinicians, people living with HIV, community advocates, policy makers and others.

Since August 2022, the president of IAS is Sharon Lewin, who is also the Director of the Peter Doherty Institute for Infection and Immunity, in Melbourne, Australia.  The previous IAS President was Adeeba Kamarulzaman (since July 2020) of Malaysia, who succeeds Anton Pozniak. Kevin Osborne is Executive Director. Past presidents have included Helene D. Gayle, Joep Lange, Peter Piot, Linda-Gail Bekker, Chris Beyrer and Françoise Barré-Sinoussi.

Conferences

International AIDS Conference 
The International AIDS Conference (abbreviated AIDS 2012, AIDS 2014 and so on) is the world's most attended conference on HIV and AIDS, and the largest conference on any global health or development issue in the world. First convened during the peak of the AIDS epidemic in 1985, they were held annually until 1994 when they became biennial. Each conference continues to provide a unique forum for the intersection of science, advocacy and human rights, as well as to strengthen policies and programmes that ensure an evidence-based response to the epidemic.

The 2006 World Aids Conference was held in Toronto, Canada.

The 22nd International AIDS Conference (AIDS 2018) was held in Amsterdam on 21–27 July 2018. Primary topics of note included: Use of dolutegravir as an antiretroviral medication was reported to result in increased rates of birth defects where the brain and spinal cord have openings (neural tube defects). Particularly of note was that an HIV infected person on treatment with undetectable virus does not spread it to an uninfected partner. 

The 23rd International AIDS Conference (AIDS 2020) was held virtually on 6–10 July 2020. The 24th International AIDS conference was held in Montreal and virtually on 29 July – 2 August 2022.

IAS Conference on HIV Science 
The IAS also organizes the IAS Conference on HIV Science (abbreviated IAS 2013, IAS 2015 and so on) (formerly called the IAS Conference on HIV Pathogenesis, Treatment and Prevention). This conference, the largest open scientific conference on HIV- and AIDS-related issues, occurs biennially and focuses on the biomedical aspects of HIV. The conference brings together professionals from around the world to examine the latest scientific developments in HIV research, prevention and treatment with a focus on moving science into practice and policy. It was held in Buenos Aires in 2001, Paris in 2003, Rio de Janeiro in 2005, Sydney in 2007, Cape Town in 2009, Rome in 2011, Kuala Lumpur in 2013, Vancouver in 2015, Paris in 2017, and Mexico City in 2019. The event was held virtually in 2021. 

The conference was called the IAS Conference on HIV Pathogenesis, Treatment and Prevention until a name change after 2015.

Publications and other resources 
The society financially supports the publication of the Journal of the International AIDS Society (JIAS), an online, open-access, peer-reviewed medical journal covering all aspects of research on HIV and AIDS.

The IAS Online Resource Library is an online collection of abstracts and other resources from international conferences, as well as numerous other materials produced by the IAS launched in January 2010.

Other activities 
The IAS works with other regional HIV/AIDS societies and networks to strengthen the capacity of HIV professionals to respond to the epidemic at the regional level. The society runs the Industry Liaison Forum, whose mission is to remove barriers to research investment by the pharmaceutical industry in resource-limited settings. The IAS also provides professional development and training opportunities for HIV professionals at both international and regional AIDS conferences through its education programme.

References

External links

 
 IAS 2019 in Mexico City, Mexico
 AIDS 2018 in Amsterdam, the Netherlands

HIV/AIDS organizations
Organizations established in 1988
Organisations based in Geneva
International professional associations
International organisations based in Switzerland